Lasana is a small village located  northeast of the city of Calama in the Calama province of Chile's northern Antofagasta Region. It sits along the banks of the Loa River.

Pukará de Lasana, (Quechua pukara fortress), a pre-Columbian fortress built in the 12th century, is the main architectural attraction of the village.

Petroglyphs can also be found in the area.

References

External links
 Sernatur - Lasana

Archaeological sites in Chile
Populated places in El Loa Province